For crossings of the East River, a tidal strait in New York City, United States, see:
List of fixed crossings of the East River (bridges and tunnels)
List of ferries across the East River

East River
New York City-related lists